The Mix may refer to:

The Mix (Kraftwerk album) (1991)
The Mix (Gary Numan album) (1998)
The Mix (Monchy & Alexandra album) (2003)
The Mix (Iranian film) (2000)
The Mix (TV series), a 2014 Australian television show
The Mix (charity), a digital charity in the United Kingdom

See also 
 In the Mix (disambiguation)
 Mix (disambiguation)
 Mixx (disambiguation)